Gábor Dvorschák (born 14 September 1989) is a Hungarian defender who plays for Kazincbarcika.

External links
 Player profile at HLSZ 
 

1989 births
Footballers from Budapest
Living people
Hungarian footballers
Association football defenders
Újpest FC players
Kecskeméti TE players
FC Carl Zeiss Jena players
Szombathelyi Haladás footballers
Mezőkövesdi SE footballers
Nyíregyháza Spartacus FC players
Soroksár SC players
Győri ETO FC players
Kaposvári Rákóczi FC players
Kazincbarcikai SC footballers
Nemzeti Bajnokság I players
Nemzeti Bajnokság II players
Nemzeti Bajnokság III players
Regionalliga players
Hungarian expatriate footballers
Expatriate footballers in Germany
Hungarian expatriate sportspeople in Germany